Läntinen suurpiiri is one of the seven major districts of Helsinki, Finland. It covers five subdistricts: Reijola, Munkkiniemi, Haaga, Pitäjänmäki and Kaarela. , western major district has 98,545 inhabitants living in an area of 30.4 km2.

Each of the five districts has several subareas:

 Reijola district 
 Laakso
 Ruskeasuo
 Meilahti
 Munkkiniemi district 
 Niemenmäki
 Munkkivuori
 Talinranta
 Vanha Munkkiniemi
 Kuusisaari
 Lehtisaari
 Haaga district 
 Etelä-Haaga
 Kivihaka
 Pohjois-Haaga
 Lassila
 Pitäjänmäki district 
 Tali
 Pajamäki
 Pitäjänmäen teollisuusalue
 Reimarla
 Marttila
 Konala
 Kaarela district 
 Kannelmäki
 Malminkartano
 Maununneva
 Hakuninmaa

References

Major districts of Helsinki